Randall David Kamien (born February 25, 1966) is a theoretical condensed matter physicist specializing in the physics of liquid crystals and is the Vicki and William Abrams Professor in the Natural Sciences at the University of Pennsylvania.

Biography
Randall Kamien was born to economist Morton Kamien and Lenore Kamien on February 25, 1966, and grew up in Wilmette, Illinois on the outskirts of Chicago. Kamien completed a B.S. and a M.S. in physics at the California Institute of Technology in 1988 and completed a PhD in Physics at Harvard University in 1992 under the supervision of David R. Nelson. Prior to joining the faculty at the University of Pennsylvania he was a member of the Institute for Advanced Study in Princeton, New Jersey, and a Postdoctoral Research Associate at the University of Pennsylvania. Kamien was appointed assistant professor at the University of Pennsylvania in 1997 and promoted to full professor in 2003. Kamien is a fellow of the American Physics Society and the American Association for the Advancement of Science. Kamien is the editor of Reviews of Modern Physics.

Research
Randall Kamien studies soft condensed matter – and in particular liquid crystalline phases of matter – through the lens of geometry and topology.   In particular, Kamien has contributed to understanding Twist Grain Boundaries, Focal Conic Domains, and defect topology in smectic liquid crystals.  He is also known for his idiosyncratic naming conventions, such as “Shnerk’s Surface”  and “Shmessel Functions.”

Publications
.
.
.
.
.
.

References 

1966 births
Living people
People from Wilmette, Illinois
21st-century American physicists
California Institute of Technology alumni
Harvard University alumni
University of Pennsylvania faculty
American people of Polish-Jewish descent